Kirchheim is a municipality in the district of Ludwigsburg in Baden-Württemberg in Germany.

References

Ludwigsburg (district)
Populated places on the Neckar basin
Populated riverside places in Germany
Populated places established in the 10th century
Württemberg